Season twenty-nine of the television program American Experience aired on the PBS network in the United States on January 10, 2017 and concluded on April 12, 2017. The season contained eight new episodes and began with the film  Command and Control.

Episodes

References

2017 American television seasons
American Experience